Miss USA 1992 was the 41st Miss USA pageant, televised live from the Century II Convention Center in Wichita, Kansas on February 7, 1992.

At the conclusion of the final competition, Shannon Marketic of California was crowned by outgoing titleholder Kelli McCarty of Kansas. Shannon became the fifth Miss USA titleholder from California and also the second Miss California USA to win both the Photogenic award and Miss USA crown, making her state the first one to repeat this feat. She is also the 4th Miss Photogenic to be crowned as Miss USA after winning the award.

The pageant was hosted by Dick Clark, with color commentary by Terry Murphy and Deborah Shelton, Miss USA 1970.

This was the third of four years that the pageant was held in Wichita.

Results

Placements

Special awards
Miss Congeniality: Alesia Prentiss (Nevada)
Miss Photogenic: Shannon Marketic (California)
Best State Costume: Heather Christine Gray (Indiana)
Best in Swimsuit: Candace Michelle Brown (Alabama)

Historical significance 
 California wins competition for the fifth time.
 Alabama earns the 1st runner-up position for the second time. The last time it placed this was in 1975.
 South Carolina earns the 2nd runner-up position for the third time. The last time it placed this was in 1983.
 Kentucky finishes as Top 6 for the second time. The last time it placed this was in 1990.
 Kansas finishes as Top 6 for the first time.
 Georgia finishes as Top 6 for the second time. The last time it placed this was in 1990.
 States that placed in semifinals the previous year were Alabama, Arizona, California, Kansas and North Carolina. All of them made their second consecutive placement. 
 Georgia, Kentucky, South Carolina and Texas last placed in 1990.
 Louisiana last placed in 1989.
 Virginia last placed in 1987.
 New Jersey breaks an ongoing streak of placements since 1989.
 Illinois breaks an ongoing streak of placements since 1984.
 California continued their tradition of producing one Miss USA winner in every decade. This was California's third top three finish in five years.
 Every state that qualified for the semifinals are geographically located south of the parallel 40° north (except for California).

Scores

Preliminary competition
The following are the contestants' scores in the preliminary competition.

 Winner
 First runner-up
 Second runner-up 
 Finalist 
 Semi-finalist

Final competition

 Winner
 First runner-up
 Second runner-up 
 Finalists

Delegates
The Miss USA 1992 delegates were:

 Alabama - Candace Michelle Brown
 Alaska - Kelly Kathleen Quirk
 Arizona - Dannis Shepherd   
 Arkansas - Jona Garner
 California - Shannon Marketic
 Colorado - Laura DeWild
 Connecticut - Catherine Sanchez
 Delaware - Julie Ann Griffith
 District of Columbia - Wanda Jones
 Florida - Sharon Belden
 Georgia - Jennifer Prodgers
 Hawaii - Heather Hays
 Idaho - Cheryl Myers
 Illinois - Leilani Magnusson
 Indiana - Heather Gray
 Iowa - Pamela Patrick
 Kansas - Kimberlee Girrens
 Kentucky - Angela Hines
 Louisiana - Christy Saylor
 Maine - Linda Kiene
 Maryland - Renee Rebstock
 Massachusetts - Christine Netishen
 Michigan - Lainie Lu Howard
 Minnesota - Amber Rue
 Mississippi - Tammy Johnson
 Missouri - Tonya Snodgrass
 Montana - Joy Estrada
 Nebraska - Jeanna Margaret Blom
 Nevada - Alesia Prentiss
 New Hampshire - Rebecca Lake
 New Jersey - Kathy Kasprak
 New Mexico - Charlotte Holland
 New York - Christine Beachak
 North Carolina - Tess Elliot
 North Dakota - Camie Fladeland
 Ohio - Courtney Baber 
 Oklahoma - Maya Walker
 Oregon - Terrie House
 Pennsylvania - Catherine Weber
 Rhode Island - Yvette Hernandez
 South Carolina - Audra Wallace 
 South Dakota - Shawn Fredrichs
 Tennessee - Natalie Bray
 Texas - Katie Young
 Utah - Nichelle Mickelson
 Vermont - Bonnie Kittredge
 Virginia - Brandi Bottorff 
 Washington - Stina McLynne
 West Virginia - Vicki Myers
 Wisconsin - Kelly Bright
 Wyoming - Lisa Postle

Contestant notes
Three contestants had previously competed in the Miss Teen USA pageant.
Kimberlee Girrens (Kansas) - Miss Kansas Teen USA 1986
Linda Kiene (Maine) - Miss Maine Teen USA 1986
Renee Rebstock (Maryland) - Miss Maryland Teen USA 1987
 Sharon Belden (Florida) later competed as Miss United States in Miss World 1992 and placed as semi-finalist.
Maya Walker (Oklahoma) had previously competed at Miss America 1989 as Miss Colorado, where she placed first runner-up.
Tess Elliott (North Carolina) was killed seven months later in a freak sky-diving accident.  
Vickie Myers (West Virginia) was from 2005 to 2006 arrested three times in eighteen months for drunk driving and was found dead in her home in January 2007.   No foul play was suspected in her death.
 Audra Wallace (South Carolina) later was Miss South Carolina World 1993 and competed in Miss World America 1993 and finished as 3rd Runner-Up.

Judges
Mickey Gilley
Chantal Cloutier
David Marlow
Laura Harring, Miss USA 1985 from Texas
Toller Cranston
Paula McClure
Paul Rodriguez
Kimberly Russell
Steve DeBerg

References

External links
Official website

1992
1992 beauty pageants
February 1992 events in the United States
1992 in Kansas